Gilberto Arminio de Almeida Rêgo (November 28, 1895 – March 4, 1970) was a Brazilian football referee. He officiated several games at the 1930 FIFA World Cup.

Gilberto de Almeida Rêgo became the first referee from Brazil to whistle in a World Cup match. He refereed in 3 matches at the Montevideo tournament in 1930:

Argentina 1-0 France, July 15; 

Uruguay 4-0 Romania, July 21;

Uruguay 6-1 Yugoslavia, July 27, semi-final.

In two matches at the tournament, he was with the flag:

France 4-1 Mexico, July 13, opening match;

Chile 1-0 France, July 19.

Gilberto de Almeida Rêgo was a member of the Comissão Técnica of the Brazil national team at the 1930 World Cup.

In Montevideo, the Brazilian delegation included Gilberto's younger brother, football player Alfredo de Almeida Rêgo or Doca. But he was not included in the official squad's list of the 22-player for tournament.

Gilberto de Almeida Rêgo, his brother Alfredo de Almeida Rêgo (1905 - 1988), and their other brother Ary de Almeida Rêgo played on the São Cristóvão basketball team. And two years in a row the brothers became Carioca basketball champions, in 1929 and 1930.

References

1895 births
1970 deaths
Brazilian football referees
FIFA World Cup referees
1930 FIFA World Cup referees

 Koloskov S. Close relatives at the World Cups. Brazilian brothers buried their father on the eve of the 1930 World Cup. And today it is difficult to find the correct dates for their lives (in Russian).